The United States of America is a country located mainly in North America.

The United States of America may also refer to:

 The United States of America (band), an experimental rock band
 The United States of America (album), a 1968 album by the band
 The United States of America (film), 1975

See also
 United States (disambiguation for country) 
 United States of North America (disambiguation)
 America (disambiguation)
 American republic (disambiguation)
 USA (disambiguation)